Baodaiqiao South Station (literally Precious Belt Bridge South Station) is a station of Line 2, Suzhou Rail Transit. The station is located in Wuzhong District of Suzhou. It started operation on December 28, 2013, the same time of the operation of Line 2.

See also
Precious Belt Bridge

References

Railway stations in Jiangsu
Suzhou Rail Transit stations
Railway stations in China opened in 2013